The Five Barbarians, or Wu Hu, is a Chinese historical exonym for five ancient non-Han peoples who immigrated to northern China in the Eastern Han dynasty, and then overthrew the Western Jin dynasty and established their own kingdoms in the 4th–5th centuries. The peoples categorized as the Five Barbarians were:
 Xiongnu
 Jie
 Xianbei
 Qiang
 Di
Of these five tribal ethnic groups, the Xiongnu and Xianbei were nomadic peoples from the northern steppes. The ethnic identity of the Xiongnu is uncertain, but the Xianbei appear to have been Mongolic. The Jie, another pastoral people, may have been a branch of the Xiongnu, who may have been Yeniseian. The Di and Qiang were from the highlands of western China. The Qiang were predominantly herdsmen and spoke Sino-Tibetan (Tibeto-Burman) languages, while the Di were farmers who may have spoken a Sino-Tibetan or Turkic language.

Definition

The term "Five Hu" was first used in the Spring and Autumn Annals of the Sixteen Kingdoms (501–522), which recorded the history of the late Western Jin dynasty and the Sixteen Kingdoms during which rebellions and warfare by and among non-Han Chinese ethnic minorities ravaged Northern China. The term Hu in earlier texts had been used to describe the Xiongnu, but became a collective term for ethnic minorities who had settled in North China and took up arms during Uprising of the Five Barbarians. This term included the Xiongnu, Xianbei, Di, Qiang and Jie.

Later historians determined that more than five nomadic tribes took part, and the Five Barbarians has become a collective term for all nomadic people residing in northern parts of the previous empires of China.

They were a mix of tribes from various stocks, such as proto-Mongolic, Turkic, Tibetan and Yeniseian. Others divide them into two Turkic tribes, one Tungusic tribe, and two Tibetan tribes, and yet others into Tibetan and Altaic (proto-Mongolian and early Turkic).

The Southern Xiongnu

The Xiongnu were a people who had migrated in and out of China proper, especially during times of turmoil, apparently at least since the days of the Qin dynasty. the Chanyu Huhanye (呼韓邪; 58–31 BCE) signed a heqin agreement with Han China in 53 BCE.

In 48 CE, after a dynastic conflict within the Xiongnu confederacy, an unnamed Shanyu (Shanyu or Chanyu meaning 'Son of Eternal Sky' and equating with the title of King) (48–56 CE) brought eight tribes of the Western Wing to China under a renewed heqin treaty, creating a polity of Southern Xiongnu in vassalage to China and a polity of Northern Xiongnu who maintained their independence.

As the Northern Xiongnu declined under internal and external conflicts, the Southern Xiongnu received waves of new migrants, and by the end of the first century CE a majority of the Xiongnu resided in China proper and along its northern borders.

In the 190s CE the Southern Xiongnu revolted against attempts of the Chinese Court to appoint a puppet Southern Shanyu against their will:

The Southern Xiongnu then elected a Shanyu from the Xubu in 188 CE and Chizhishizhuhou Chanyu (188–195 CE) fled back to the Chinese court. After the death of the new Shanyu in 196 CE, most of the Southern Xiongnu left to join the Northern Xiongnu and only five tribes remained in China.

The War of the Eight Princes during the Jin dynasty (266–420) triggered a large-scale Southern Xiongnu uprising after 304, which resulted in the sacking of the Chinese capitals at Luoyang (311) and Chang'an. The Xiongnu Kingdom of Han Zhao captured and executed the last two Jin emperors as the Western Jin dynasty collapsed in 317. Many Chinese fled south of the Yangtze as numerous tribesmen of the Xiongnu and remnants of the Jin wreaked havoc in the north. Fu Jian (337–385) temporarily unified the north but his achievement was destroyed after the Battle of Fei River. The Northern Wei unified North China again in 439 and ushered in the period of the Northern Dynasties.

The Five Barbarians after the fall of Northern Xiongnu
In the first century the Eastern Han dynasty brought the Northern Xiongnu into submission by military measures. Hordes of herdsmen and the Southern Xiongnu, originally subdued by the Northern Xiongnu, began trading without having heavy tribute imposed on them. Horses and animal products were traded mainly for agricultural tools, such as the harrow and the plough, and clothing of which silk was most popular. In return those herdsmen helped defend the Han dynasty against any remaining Xiongnu. The more they engaged in commerce with the Chinese, the more they preferred to stay near China's border, to facilitate trade, instead of residing on the steppes of Manchuria and Mongolia.

Some groups of non-Xiongnu herdsmen even settled permanently within the Chinese borders, first of which was the Wuhuan (烏桓), who migrated to the area of today's Province of Liaoning during the era of Jiangwu (25–56). Note that the Southern Xiongnu migrated before the Wuhuan but not for commercial reasons.

Liaison among the dynasty and groups of herdsmen relied on mutual economic and military benefits. As the Northern Xiongnu, the masters of the Mongolian steppes and mortal enemy of the Han dynasty, were still potent enough during the reigns of Emperor Ming, Emperor Zhang and Emperor He (58–105) to keep the volatile alliance intact, the Eastern Han dynasty enjoyed the most prosperous years of its almost 200 years of existence. Even fragments of the Northern Xiongnu migrated well within the border to the Xihe plain, west of the Yellow River and south of the Ordos Desert).

The picture drastically changed in the later years of Emperor He's reign, son of Emperor Zhang. Dou Xian (50s–92), brother-in-law of Emperor Zhang through his sister Empress Duo, utterly defeated the Northern Xiongnu in a series of campaigns during the Yongyuan era (89–105). The remnants just escaped annihilation, conceded defeat, began migrating out of the Mongolian steppes and disappeared as a distinct group of herdsmen once and for all. Others were assimilated into other tribes by intermarriage: the Yuwen tribe being a good example.

In their wake a power vacuum was left on the Mongolian steppes.  The main contenders were the Southern Xiongnu, who inhabited a region to the south of the steppe and had now grown into a  group of more than a hundred thousand herdsmen on the Xihe plain; the Xianbei, who lived in the east of the steppe residing on the plains of Manchuria; the Dingling, who originally dwelt on the banks of Lake Baikal and had already commenced trekking south into the steppes before Duo Xian destroyed the Northern Xiongnu; and the Wuhuan, who lived south of the Xianbei and were the weakest of the four.

Instead of constantly trading for provisions, tools and luxuries, these four powerful groups of herdsmen, though still allies of the Han dynasty, often cooperated to plunder areas of the northern border.  The dynasty could not muster an all-out campaign to wipe them out, but often attempted, through diplomatic and monetary measures to split one or more groups from the alliance of herdsmen.

On the other hand, the dynasty was constantly declining as clans of consorts and eunuchs engaged in a continuous struggle for power. Wealthy merchants and aristocrats were acquiring lands from peasants who had been cultivating their own land for years. "Landless" peasants had to come under the protection of the rich and so pay rent to these new landowners rather than pay taxes to the government. Coupled with bureaucratic corruption, tax revenues dropped dramatically.  Large landholding families also took advantages of the weakness of central government and established their own armies.  Increasingly governors of regions (the highest level) administered their territories as independent rulers. The recruitment of troops and tax collection could be carried out at the discretion of the regional governors, contributing to the disunity that led to the inevitable crumbling of China into the Three Kingdoms.

The dynasty also had to deal with the Qiang and Di on the western border, who had constantly been involved in skirmishes against the dynasty since the middle of Western Han dynasty (around mid-first century BCE). As the Eastern Han dynasty declined, the Qiang, nominal ancestors of modern Tibetans, began planning major invasions. Through spies and collaborators, the Han court knew about the situation and had to deploy soldiers near the border to fend off Qiang skirmishes and small-scale invasions.

Although few major Qiang invasions were carried out, never successfully, such a military deployment constantly drained the treasury and was a cradle for ambitious militarists, the most famous of whom was Dong Zhuo (130s–192), the pretender to the Han court from 189-192. The more the Han court weakened through domestic problems, the more the herdsmen craved the dynasty's wealth. The Wuhuan were a frequent ally with the Han court against Xianbei and the Southern Xiongnu, although they also sometimes allied with the Xiongnu to fend off joint attacks by the Han and Xianbei.

The Han court also deployed mercenaries from the Xianbei and Wuhuan for campaigns against the rebels and to quell peasant insurgents.  These mercenaries were often sympathetic to the peasant uprising and hence not trusted by the Han military authorities. However they were the best available option for suppressing the insurgents and consequently these soldiers were poorly treated by being deployed far away from their homeland, or in the most dangerous positions on the battlefield or by starving them of provisions and weapons. Thus military who could earn the trust of the Xianbei or Wuhuan would collaborate with the tribes for the sake of their own careers.

For instance a unit of about 5,000 Wuhuan cavalry that usually resided in You Province (part of modern northeastern Hebei and western Liaoning Province) was deployed in Southern Jing Province (in Hunan Province) for three consecutive years. The rebellions (187-189) of Zhang Chun (張純; died 189) and Zhang Ju (張舉; died 189) in You Province in alliance with this Wuhuan cavalry unit marked the first of many such collaborations. Yuan Shao (140s–202) and Gongsun Zan (140s–199), two warlords of the end of the Han dynasty, also exploited Wuhuan and Xianbei respectively in their own quests for predominance. Ironically Gongsun Zan was the commander tasked with suppressing the rebellion of Zhang Chun and Zhang Ju.

Xianbei confederacy of Tanshihuai
The difficult relationship between the Han court and various nomadic groups lasted from the start of the second century to the early 160s and the appearance of Tanshihuai (檀石槐 b. 120s - d. 181), an illegitimate son of a low ranking military officer of Xianbei mercenaries deployed against the Southern Xiongnu.  Despite his low social status among Xianbei herdsmen, he managed to unify all the Xianbei tribes under his rule in a confederacy against the Han court.

Each Xianbei tribe was led by a chieftain and were grouped under the confederacy into three smaller federations, the Western, the Central and the Eastern. Notable chieftains under Tanshihuai were Murong (see Sixteen Kingdoms), Huitou (see Sixteen Kingdoms) and Tuiyin (see Tuoba).

The confederacy was a rudimentary centralized government. All tribes had to share all trade profits, military duties and a unified stance against the Han court. Slavery was also important as captives were forced to work to provide provisions and weapons.

Supported by this confederacy, Tanshihuai brought the Southern Xiongnu into a close alliance. The Wuhuan, Dingling, Qiang and Di were at times aiding the confederacy which now included all the major tribes on the steppes stretching from today Jilin province to central Xinjiang.

Uneasiness at the Han court about this development of a new power on the steppes finally ushered in a campaign on the northern border to annihilate the confederacy once and for all.  In 177 A.D., 30,000 Han cavalry attacked the confederacy, commanded by Xia Yu (夏育), Tian Yan (田晏) and Zang Min (臧旻), each of whom was the commander of units sent respectively against the Wuhuan, the Qiang, and the Southern Xiongnu before the campaign.

Each military officer commanded 10,000 cavalrymen and advanced north on three different routes, aiming at each of the three federations. Cavalry units commanded by chieftains of each of the three federations almost annihilated the invading forces. Eighty percent of the troops were killed and the three officers, who only brought tens of men safely back, were relieved from their posts.

Tanshihuai found a temporary solution when he sacked the area of modern Jilin province. To make the matters worse, the successors of Tanshihuai (his sons and nephews) after his death in 181 never earned the respect from the chieftains of the three federations. They were also less ambitious and constantly fought among themselves for the increasingly powerless lord of confederacy.

On the other hand, tribes began to emigrate from the steppe, mainly to the southwest and southeast for better pasture. The weakness of the Han court also encouraged tribes to move further into China.  For example, the Tufa (禿髮) tribe, an offshoot of the Tuiyin (Northern Wei Dynasty), settled in the eastern mountainous area of today's Qinghai province.  Thus, the effective border of the Han dynasty was pushed further south and east. The confederacy was virtually dissolved in the early third century, allowing the warlords of the Han dynasty to play their own game of fighting for supremacy without much interference from tribes outside of China.

Barbarian immigration during the Three Kingdoms
As the Eastern Han dynasty slowly disintegrated into an era of warlords, battles for predominance eventually ushered in the Three Kingdoms.  However years of war had generated a severe shortage of labor, a solution to which was the immigration of foreigners.  Thus the Wei court, controlling Northern China at the time, allowed weaker tribes to settle in areas depopulated by war.  Several large-scale forced relocations of Di to southwestern Shaanxi and northern Sichuan took place in the 220s.

Surprising to some historians, the immigration went smoothly since no powerful confederacy of any tribes was established. The Wuhuan, partisans of Yuan Shao and his sons, had already been squashed when Cao Cao sent an expedition into You Province.  Its herdsmen were dispersed all over Northern China and were no longer a major threat.

The later years saw only border skirmishes as the three governments concentrated on reclaiming the loss of productivity.  Thus after the unification under the Western Jin dynasty an era of prosperity began as the relocated tribes adopted agriculture and contributed to the revival of the economy.  Other tribes, still residing in the areas that they had occupied since the Eastern Han dynasty, frequently served as mercenaries against minor rebellious chieftains such as Kebineng and Tufa Shujineng.

However the Jin bureaucracy forgot an underlying threat: Living in areas well south of the Great Wall and closer than ever before to the capital of China at Luoyang, any widespread uprising by the Wu Hu would be impossible to halt.

Jin dynasty and the Uprising of the Five Barbarians

An era of relative prosperity had existed since Jin Wudi unified China in 280. The so-called barbarians residing inside and near China regularly paid taxes to the Jin court. They traded horses and animal products for agricultural goods and silk and could be paid to fight as mercenaries.

Some officials foresaw a crisis. Discussion of the God of Money (錢神論 Qián Shén Lùn) and Discussion on Tribe Relocation (徒戎論 Tú Róng Lùn) condemned the decadence of the aristocracy and warned of an uprising by ethnic minorities living in northern China.  The latter work provides accurate locations of the region where the ethnic minorities resided. Southern Xiongnu now dominated Bingzhou (in modern Shanxi province) and their horsemen could arrive at Jinyang (Taiyuan) in half-a-day's ride and Luoyang, the capital, in a few days.

The accession of the Jin Emperor Hui in 290 marked the beginning of the crumbling of the Jin dynasty.  Possibly developmentally disabled, he was a puppet of powerful parties which sought to control the Jin court.  During the Rebellion of the Eight Kings, all parties in power attempted to wipe out the former rulers by murder, mass executions or battles. Each struggle grew more violent and bloodier than the one before. Not surprisingly, Wu Hu mercenaries were often called upon. Wu Hu chieftains and herdsmen clearly comprehended the selfishness of the nobility and the destruction of the country through their struggle for power and wealth. Coupled with famine, epidemic and floods, cannibalism was observed in some parts of the country only a few years after Emperor Hui's accession. Wu Hu herdsmen saw no reason to obey orders from the Jin court and widespread uprisings soon followed.

The revolt by Qi Wannian (齊萬年), a Di chieftain residing in the border region of today's Shaanxi and Sichuan provinces, marked the first such uprising.  His group of insurgents, which was mainly made up of Di and Qiang tribesmen, numbered around fifty thousand.  Although his revolt was suppressed after six years of destructive battles, waves of refugees and remnants wreaked havoc in neighboring territories. The first of the Sixteen Kingdoms was founded by a group of Di refugees who fled into Sichuan.

See also
History of China
Han dynasty
Three Kingdoms
Jin dynasty (266–420)
Sixteen Kingdoms
Southern and Northern Dynasties
Northern Wei Dynasty
Shiliuguo Chunqiu
Chinese sovereign
Xiongnu
Xianbei
Di (Wu Hu)
Qiang
Jie
Donghu people
Wuhuan
Dingling
Tiele
Manchu
Jurchen
Khitan
Heishui Mohe
Sushen
List of past Chinese ethnic groups

References

 
Sixteen Kingdoms
Three Kingdoms
Ancient peoples of China
Mongol peoples
Jin dynasty (266–420)
Wars involving Imperial China
Barbarians